Råna is a mountain in Møre og Romsdal county, Norway. The mountain sits on the municipal border between the municipalities of Ørsta and Sykkylven. It is part of Hjelledalstindane mountains in the Sunnmørsalpene range.

See also
List of mountains of Norway

References

Mountains of Møre og Romsdal
Sykkylven
Ørsta